Charlie Jane Anders (born July 24, 1969) is an American writer and commentator. She has written several novels, published magazines and websites, and hosted podcasts. In 2005, she received the Lambda Literary Award for work in the transgender category, and in 2009, the Emperor Norton Award. Her 2011 novelette Six Months, Three Days won the 2012 Hugo and was a finalist for the Nebula and Theodore Sturgeon Awards. Her 2016 novel All the Birds in the Sky was listed No. 5 on Time magazine's "Top 10 Novels" of 2016, won the 2017 Nebula Award for Best Novel, the 2017 Crawford Award, and the 2017 Locus Award for Best Fantasy Novel; it was also a finalist for the 2017 Hugo Award for Best Novel.

Biography
Anders was born near Storrs, Connecticut, and grew up in nearby Mansfield. She studied English and Asian Literature at the University of Cambridge, and studied in China before moving to San Francisco in the early 2000s. Anders co-founded Other magazine, the "magazine of pop culture and politics for the new outcasts", with Annalee Newitz, and served as publisher during the magazine's run from 2002 to 2007. In 2006, she was a co-founding editor of the science fiction blog io9, a position she left in April 2016 to focus on novel writing.

Career
Anders has had science fiction published in Tor.com, Strange Horizons, and Flurb. Additional (non-science-fiction) literary work has been published in McSweeney's and Zyzzyva.  Anders's work has appeared in Salon, The Wall Street Journal, Publishers Weekly, San Francisco Bay Guardian, Mother Jones, and the San Francisco Chronicle. She has had stories and essays in anthologies such as Sex For America: Politically Inspired Erotica, The McSweeney's Joke Book of Book Jokes, and That's Revolting!: Queer Strategies for Resisting Assimilation.

Her first novel, Choir Boy, appeared in 2005 from Soft Skull Press; a young adult story about a boy transitioning gender in order to sing. In 2014, Tor Books acquired two novels from Anders. All the Birds in the Sky was published in 2016 and The City in the Middle of the Night was published 2019. 

Tor Teen acquired a young adult trilogy from Anders in 2017. The first novel, Victories Greater than Death, was published in 2021, and the second, Dreams Bigger than Heartbreak, in 2022.

In addition to her work as an author and publisher, Anders is a longtime event organizer. She organized a "ballerina pie fight" in 2005 for Other magazine; co-organized the Cross-Gender Caravan, a national transgender and genderqueer author tour; and a Bookstore and Chocolate Crawl in San Francisco. She emcees "Writers with Drinks", an award-winning San Francisco-based monthly reading series begun in 2001 that features authors from a wide range of genres and has been noted for its "free-associative author introductions".

She has been a juror for the James Tiptree Jr. Award and for the Lambda Literary Award. She formerly published the satirical website godhatesfigs.com which was featured by The Sunday Times as website of the week.

A television adaptation of Anders' Six Months, Three Days was being prepared for NBC in 2013, with the script written by Eric Garcia.

In March 2018, with her partner and co-host Annalee Newitz, Anders launched the podcast Our Opinions Are Correct, which "explor[es] the meaning of science fiction, and how it's relevant to real-life science and society." The podcast won the Hugo Award for Best Fancast in 2019.

Anders co-created the Marvel Comics character Shela Sexton, also known as Escapade, a trans mutant super hero. The character debuted in Marvel's Voices: Pride #1 in June 2022.

Awards and recognition 
Anders participated in the 2018 BookCon conference in New York City. She was Professional Guest of Honor at the 2019 WisCon.

 2005 Best of the Bay Award for Writers with Drinks
 2006 Best of the Bay Award for Writers with Drinks
 2006 Edmund White Award for Debut Fiction finalist, for Choir Boy
 2006 Lambda Literary Award, for Choir Boy
 2011 Hugo, Nebula, and Theodore Sturgeon Award nominations for Six Months, Three Days.
 2012 Hugo Award for Six Months, Three Days
 2017 Nebula Award for All the Birds in the Sky
 2017 IAFA William L. Crawford Fantasy Award for All the Birds in the Sky
 2017 Locus Award for Best Fantasy Novel for All the Birds in the Sky
 2018 Theodore Sturgeon Award for Don't Press Charges and I Won't Sue
 2019 Hugo Award for Best Fancast for Our Opinions Are Correct (shared with Annalee Newitz)
 2020 Arthur C. Clarke Award nomination for The City in the Middle of the Night
 2020 Locus Award for Best Science Fiction Novel for The City in the Middle of the Night.
 2020 Locus Award for Best Short Story for "The Bookstore at the End of America"
 2022 Hugo Award, Best Related Work for Never Say You Can’t Survive
 2022 Hugo Award for Best Fancast for Our Opinions Are Correct (shared with Annalee Newitz)

Bibliography

Novels
 
 
 
 Unstoppable:

Short story collections

Short fiction

Non-fiction

Never Say You Can't Survive: How to Get Through Hard Times By Making Up Stories. New York: Tordotcom. 2021. ISBN 9781250800015.

Interviews

Critical studies and reviews of Anders' work

Notes

External links

 
 
 Charlie Jane Anders at The Encyclopedia of Science Fiction
 Other magazine
 Our Opinions are Correct podcast

1969 births
Living people
21st-century American novelists
21st-century American women writers
American magazine publishers (people)
American science fiction writers
American technology writers
American women novelists
Asimov's Science Fiction people
People with non-binary gender identities
Hugo Award-winning writers
American LGBT novelists
LGBT people from Connecticut
Lambda Literary Award winners
Transgender women
Transgender novelists
Women science fiction and fantasy writers
Nebula Award winners
American women non-fiction writers
21st-century American non-fiction writers
People from Mansfield, Connecticut
American transgender writers